Arambhada is a census town in Jamnagar district in the Indian state of Gujarat.its princely state of rana (vadher)

Demographics
 India census, Arambhada had a population of 15,008. Males constitute 51% of the population and females 49%. Arambhada has an average literacy rate of 53%, lower than the national average of 59.5%; with 61% of the males and 39% of females literate. 16% of the population is under 6 years of age.
Arambhda has become part of Okha Nagar Palika.

Notable people

Tapomurti Sadguru Shastri Shri Narayanprasaddasji Swami, A well known Sadhu/Swami of Swaminarayan Sampraday had been living in this Village at his Kutir/House called Shanti Kutir for the Last 30 years of his life.

References

Cities and towns in Jamnagar district